Adam Shareef Umar is a Maldivian politician who was Minister of Defence and National Security in the Cabinet of the Maldives from 2015 to 2018. He was also a Special Envoy of the President of the Maldives.

He graduated from the University of East Anglia with an MA in Education in 2008 and served as Maldivian Minister of State for Education from 2014 to 2015.

Adam Shareed Umar is currently the Parliament Member for the Madduvari Constituency since 2019.

References

Year of birth missing (living people)
Living people
Alumni of the University of East Anglia
Government ministers of the Maldives